Trisha Deb is an Indian archer. She won the Bronze Medal at the 2014 Asian Games in Incheon in the women's individual compound archery event and in the  women's team compound along with Purvasha Shende and Jyothi Surekha Vennam.

References

Living people
Indian female archers
Asian Games medalists in archery
Archers at the 2014 Asian Games
Archers at the 2018 Asian Games
Asian Games bronze medalists for India
21st-century Indian women
21st-century Indian people
Medalists at the 2014 Asian Games
1991 births
Place of birth missing (living people)